MCM is a French music video TV channel owned by Groupe MCM. It was started in 1989 by Groupe Europe 1 following the MTV model, as the French version of MTV. MCM broadcasts three encrypted music TV channels "MCM France", "MCM Pop" and "MCM Top" as part of the "CanalSat France" subscription TV package from the Astra 19.2°E cluster of direct-to-home broadcast satellites at the 19.2 degrees East orbital position.

From 2001 – 2003, MCM also broadcast in Thailand, operated by local licensee Broadcast Network Thailand (aka: UBC) playing a mix of alternative and electronica music, and hosted by a variety of bilingual VJs speaking Thai and English, including Sara Malakul, Kipsan Beck and Fah Chanika Sucharitkul.

Since 2013 the High Council of Audiovisual (CSA) published the authorization of the new positioning of the initial programming of the MCM channel, towards a more male audience between 15 and 34 years.

Logos
From 1989, there have been seven different logos for this channel. The first logo of channel is used from 1989 to 1991, the second logo is used from 1991 to 1998, the third logo is used from 1998 to 2001, the fourth logo is used from 2001 to 2005, the fifth logo is used from 2005 to 2007, the sixth is used from 2007 to 2017, and the seventh and current logo is in use from 2017.

From 1990 to 1995, the digital on-screen graphic was located on the upper left corner of the screen. From 1995 onwards, it has been moved to the upper right corner of the screen and dropped from upper left corner.

References

External links
 

MCM Group
Television stations in France
French-language television stations
Television channels and stations established in 1989
Lagardère Active
Defunct mass media in Thailand